Paul R. Neumann (born January 30, 1938) is an American retired basketball player who played in the National Basketball Association (NBA).

Early career
A guard, Neumann attended Newport Harbor High School in Newport Beach, California and played college basketball for Stanford University.

NBA career
He was selected in the 4th round of the 1959 NBA draft by the Syracuse Nationals. He played two seasons with the Nationals, and remained with the team as it moved to Philadelphia and was renamed the Philadelphia 76ers.

In 1965, he was traded at mid-season along with Connie Dierking and Lee Shaffer to the San Francisco Warriors for Wilt Chamberlain, a trade that is frequently cited as an example of a star player (in this case, Chamberlain) being traded for far less than he is worth.

He played two more full seasons with the Warriors before retiring in 1967.

References

External links
Career statistics from Basketball-Reference.com
Stanford University Hall-of-Fame

1938 births
Living people
Amateur Athletic Union men's basketball players
American men's basketball players
Philadelphia 76ers players
Point guards
San Diego Rockets expansion draft picks
San Francisco Warriors players
Stanford Cardinal men's basketball players
Syracuse Nationals draft picks
Syracuse Nationals players